Mt. Union Cemetery is located in Philomath, Oregon. The land for the Mt. Union Cemetery was donated by Reuben Shipley and his wife Mary Jane Holmes Shipley Drake with the stipulation that both Black people and white people could be buried there. The Shipleys were former slaves who donated 3 acres of their land on May 1, 1861. Mt. Union was the first cemetery in the region to permit burials of multiple races.

The cemetery has expanded over the years to seven acres, with over two thousand graves. The headstone for Reuben Shipley procured by his son displays the surname of Ficklin, which is presumed to have been the name of an earlier enslaver. The cemetery entrance has a large granite marker honoring the Shipleys, which was installed in 1981. The historical writer R. Gregory Nokes describes Mt. Union cemetery as "a lasting legacy to racial cooperation and understanding".

Mt. Union Cemetery was listed on the Benton County Historic Register on November 14, 1994.

Approximately 2,500 people are buried at the cemetery, with additional space for 1,500 to 1,700 more. A new section was added to the cemetery in the 1970s.

Notable interments 
 Reuben Shipley
 Mary Jane Holmes Shipley Drake

References

External links
 
 
  

Cemeteries in Oregon
African-American cemeteries